A Beckman Fellow receives funding, usually via an intermediary institution, from the Arnold and Mabel Beckman Foundation, founded by Arnold Orville Beckman and his wife Mabel.  The Foundation supports programs at several institutions to encourage research, particularly the work of young researchers who might not be eligible for other sources of funding.  People from a variety of different programs at different institutions may therefore be referred to as Beckman Fellows. Though most often designating postdoctoral awards in science, the exact significance of the term will vary depending on the institution involved and the type(s) of Beckman Fellowship awarded at that institution.

Arnold and Mabel Beckman Foundation

Arnold O. Beckman Postdoctoral Fellowships 
The Arnold O. Beckman Postdoctoral Fellowship program was sponsored by the Arnold and Mabel Beckman Foundation to support research at US institutions in the biological and chemical sciences. A total of sixty Fellowships were awarded from 2015 – 2017. After an evaluation in 2018, the Foundation then relaunched the program for 2019 as the Arnold O. Beckman Postdoctoral Fellowship in Chemical Sciences or Chemical Instrumentation.   The purpose of the program is to support advanced research by postdoctoral scholars in fundamental chemistry research or the development of chemical instrumentation.

University of Illinois at Urbana–Champaign

Beckman Institute for Advanced Science and Technology 
The Beckman Institute for Advanced Science and Technology at the University of Illinois at Urbana–Champaign offers a variety of fellowship programs.

Beckman Graduate Fellowships
Beckman Graduate Fellowships are awarded to students at the University of Illinois who are working at the master's or doctorate level. Students propose interdisciplinary research projects involving at least two University of Illinois faculty members, at least one of whom is associated with the Beckman Institute. The award provides funding at the level of a 50% Graduate Research Assistantship for eleven months.

Beckman Postdoctoral Fellows
Beckman Postdoctoral Fellowships are awarded to recent Ph.D.'s who receive 3-year appointments at the Beckman Institute, including both a stipend and a research budget. They must be doing interdisciplinary research in an area of research relevant to the Beckman Institute. The first Beckman postdoctoral fellows were Efrat Shimshoni (condensed matter physics) and Andrew Nobel (information theory and statistics) in 1992.

Since the founding of the original Beckman Institute Postdoctoral Fellows Program, two similar programs have been initiated: the Carle Foundation Hospital-Beckman Institute Postdoctoral Fellows Program (begun in 2008 and jointly funded by the Carle Foundation Hospital of Urbana, Illinois) and the Beckman-Brown Interdisciplinary Postdoctoral Fellowship (begun in 2015 by an endowment from the Arnold O. and Mabel M. Beckman Foundation made in honor of Theodore L. Brown, founding director of the Beckman Institute).

The following researchers are or have been Beckman Postdoctoral Fellows. The institution listed is the one from which the person had received a Ph.D. Fellowships were awarded as of the year listed.

Beckman Senior Fellows
Beckman Senior Fellowships are awarded to senior faculty from other institutions, who come to the University of Illinois to collaborate with researchers there, usually for a short period of three to six months.
Beckman Senior Fellows include:

 Luisa Ciobanu (NeuroSpin, France, 2020)
 Nelson Cowan (University of Missouri, 2017)
 Frini Karayanidis (University of Newcastle, Australia, 2016)
 Christophe Chipot (CNRS, France, 2015)
 Daniel A. King (Eastern Mennonite University, 2014)
 Kirk Erickson (University of Pittsburgh,  2013–2014)
 Lisa Frank (University of Wisconsin at Madison, 2012–2013)
 Jong Chul Ye (KAIST, 2012–2013)
 Nadja Schott (Justus-Liebig-University in Giessen, Germany, 2007)
 Dimitris C. Lagoudas (Texas Institute for Intelligent Bio-Nano Materials and Structures for Aerospace Vehicles, 2006)
 Gerald Penn (University of Toronto, 2006)
 Kevin Warwick (University of Reading, UK 2004)
 Jan Theeuews (Vrije Universiteit, Amsterdam, 2002)

Center for Advanced Study (CAS) 
In addition to the Beckman Fellowships administered through the Beckman Institute for Advanced Science and Technology,  the Arnold and Mabel Beckman Foundation supports additional programs through the Center for Advanced Study (CAS) at the University of Illinois at Urbana-Champaign.  The CAS awards a series of Beckman Fellowships and Beckman Research Awards which support faculty at Urbana-Champaign in their research activities.  These awards were funded through an endowment from Arnold and Mabel Beckman, given in the late 1970s, prior to the establishment of the Beckman Institute.  They are administered separately and are awarded in departments throughout the university, not just within the sciences.

The Center for Advanced Study (CAS) has awarded Beckman Fellowships to the following University of Illinois at Urbana-Champaign faculty members, with their home department and Fellowship award year shown.

Stanford University

Beckman Center for Molecular and Genetic Medicine, Stanford School of Medicine 
The Beckman Center for Molecular and Genetic Medicine in the Stanford School of Medicine was funded in part by $12 million from the Arnold and Mabel Beckman Foundation, approximately one-fifth of the costs for the new center. It opened in May 1989. The Beckman Fellows program was established in 1999 to support young researchers. Recipients include:

 Susanna Mlynarczyk-Evans (2008–2011)
 Sheila Jaswal (2003–2006)
 Zach Serber (2003–2006)
 Frederic Charron (2002–2005)
 Kevin Travers (2002–2005)
 Michael Galko (2001–2004)

California Institute of Technology (Caltech)

Beckman Institute at Caltech 
In 2000, the Beckman Institute at Caltech in Pasadena received a grant from the Beckman  Foundation to support Beckman Postgraduate Fellowships for five years. Fellowships were for a three-year period. The following people have been recipients:

University of California at Irvine (UC Irvine)

Gavin Herbert Eye Institute (UC Irvine Health) 
The Arnold and Mabel Beckman Foundation supported construction of The Gavin Herbert Eye Institute at the University of California, Irvine School of Medicine. The facility is designed specifically for ease of use by low-vision patients. The institute opened in 2013, and as of Feb. 12, 2013, was awarded a grant for fellowships by the Beckman Foundation.

References

American awards
Fellowships